Kameron Rashad Kelly (born August 19, 1996) is a professional gridiron football defensive back for the San Antonio Brahmas. He played college football at San Diego State as a safety and cornerback.

Early years 
Kelly was born in Round Rock, Texas, and grew up in Wylie, Texas, where he attended Wylie High School. As a dual-threat quarterback, he was rated a two-star recruit by Rivals.com and committed to play college football at San Diego State.

College career 
In his true freshman season, Kelly converted to safety and was promoted to backup before suffering a knee injury that was complicated by compartment syndrome. He missed the final six games of the season. In his sophomore season, he started all 13 of his games, recording 37 tackles and two interceptions. He returned to a backup role in his junior season, but recorded a career-high five interceptions.

In his senior year, after converting to cornerback, he started all 13 games and had the most impressive season of his college career. He recorded a career-high 54 tackles, two sacks, and two forced fumbles, in addition to three interceptions. Both of his sacks were recorded in a game against then-19th ranked Stanford, in addition to six tackles, two of which were for a loss. That game earned him a Bronko Nagurski National Defensive Player of the Week award, as well as a Mountain West Defensive Player of the Week award. At the end of the season, he was named a first-team all-Mountain West selection.

Professional career

Dallas Cowboys
After going undrafted in the 2018 NFL Draft, Kelly signed as an undrafted free agent with the Dallas Cowboys. He was later released before the preseason began.

San Diego Fleet
On October 27, 2018, Kelly was signed by the San Diego Fleet of the Alliance of American Football for the 2019 AAF season. In early January, he was switched to the wide receiver position, and on January 30, it was announced that he made the final roster at that position. In practice before the week 3 game, head coach Mike Martz announced that Kelly would be moved back to cornerback due to injuries.

In week 5 against the Salt Lake Stallions, Kelly intercepted Stallions quarterback Josh Woodrum three times, one of which was returned for a 22-yard touchdown, as the Fleet won 27–25. He was eventually named the AAF Defensive Player of the Week.

Pittsburgh Steelers
After the AAF suspended football operations, Kelly signed with the Pittsburgh Steelers on April 8, 2019.
Kelly made his debut with the Steelers in week 1 against the New England Patriots.  In the game, Kelly made 7 tackles in the 33–3 loss.  In week 5 against the Baltimore Ravens, Kelly recorded his first career interception off Lamar Jackson in the 26–23 loss.

On December 20, 2019, Kelly was arrested in Pittsburgh's southside after claims of threats towards police. He was waived by the Steelers later in the day. The charges were dropped by December 2020, and Kelly was fined half of a game salary by the NFL.

Hamilton Tiger-Cats
Kelly signed with the Hamilton Tiger-Cats of the CFL on February 17, 2021. He played in all 14 regular season games in 2021 where he had 36 defensive tackles, 10 pass deflections, one sack, and one interception.

References

External links 
Hamilton Tiger-Cats bio

1996 births
Living people
American football cornerbacks
American football safeties
American football wide receivers
Dallas Cowboys players
Hamilton Tiger-Cats players
People from Wylie, Texas
Pittsburgh Steelers players
Players of American football from Texas
San Diego Fleet players
San Diego State Aztecs football players
Sportspeople from the Dallas–Fort Worth metroplex